Didier Detchénique (born 4 October 1972) is a retired French high jumper.

He finished twelfth at the 1997 World Indoor Championships, won the bronze medal at the 1997 Summer Universiade and finished ninth at the 2000 European Indoor Championships He also competed at the 1997 World Championships and the 1998 European Indoor Championships

Detchénique became French champion in 1996, 1997 and 1998 and French indoor champion in 1995, 1997, 1998 and 2000. His personal best was 2.31 metres, achieved in June 1997 in Saint-Denis.

References

1972 births
Living people
French male high jumpers
World Athletics Championships athletes for France
Universiade medalists in athletics (track and field)
Universiade bronze medalists for France
Medalists at the 1997 Summer Universiade
20th-century French people